Frontier Co-op is a cooperatively owned American wholesaler of natural and organic products, founded in 1976 and based in Norway, Iowa, US. It sells products under the Frontier Co-op, Simply Organic and Aura Cacia brands. Products include culinary herbs, spices and baking flavors; bulk herbs and spices; and natural and organic aromatherapy products. Frontier Co-op manufactures and distributes products throughout the United States and Canada.

See also 
 List of food companies
 List of food cooperatives

Notes

External links 
 

Companies based in Iowa
Food manufacturers of the United States
Food cooperatives in the United States